"Fade Away" is a song by American rapper Logic. The song was released on November 5, 2015 by Visionary Music Group and Def Jam Recordings as the third single from his second studio album, The Incredible True Story. The track was written and produced by Logic himself. The song samples "I'm Gone" by Logic and "Deck the Halls" performed by The Singers Unlimited.

Background
Logic said in an interview with Genius that "“Fade Away” is about accepting death and that no matter who you are, what historical figure, any of that, one day your name will be forgotten. Whether a comet hits the Earth or we all repopularize one day, you'll be forgotten. Do something for you before you fade away."

Versions 
In December of 2022, Logic appeared on Norah Jones Is Playing Along podcast, where Norah Jones and Logic collaborated on several of his songs. Their version of "Fade Away" was shared to YouTube and Spotify, among other sites.

Charts

Weekly charts

Certifications

Release history

References

External links

Lyrics of this song at Genius

2015 singles
2015 songs
Logic (rapper) songs
Def Jam Recordings singles
Songs written by Big Sean
Songs written by Logic (rapper)